Andras Laszlo Kovacs Fernandez, credited as László Kovács (born in Lima, Peru, December 3, 1978), is a Peruvian television actor best known for his playing Tito Lara in the TV series Al Fondo Hay Sitio.

Biography
Born to parents Andras Kovács Toth and Carmen Fernandez, Kovács' career began in 1997 with the telenovelas Torbellino ("Whirlwind") and Leonela, Muriendo de Amor ("Leonela, Dying of Love"). He has since appeared in a dozen different TV series and in 2005 expanded his career to include stage acting and musical theatre.

External links 
 

People from Lima
Peruvian male telenovela actors
Peruvian male musical theatre actors
1978 births
Living people
20th-century Peruvian male actors
21st-century Peruvian male actors
Peruvian people of Hungarian descent